The Permanent Resident Identity Card for Foreigners of the People's Republic of China, formerly known as the Permanent Resident Card for Foreigners, is a legal identity document for foreigners who have obtained permanent residence qualifications in China to reside in China.

History 

In 1986, Article 14 of the "Law of the People's Republic of China on the Administration of Entry and Exit of Foreigners" (effective on February 1, 1986; repealed on June 30, 2012) stipulates: "Investment in China or with Chinese enterprises in accordance with Chinese laws, public institutions engaged in economic, scientific and technological, cultural cooperation and other foreigners who need to reside in China for a long time, with the approval of the competent authorities of the Chinese government, can obtain long-term residency or permanent residency. Detailed Rules (approved by the State Council on December 3, 1986, promulgated by the Ministry of Public Security and the Ministry of Foreign Affairs on December 27, 1986 ; revised with the approval of the State Council on July 13, 1994.)

On August 15, 2004, the Ministry of Public Security and the Ministry of Foreign Affairs of the People's Republic of China issued Order No. 74 to implement the "Administrative Measures for the Approval of Foreigners' Permanent Residence in China" (approved by the State Council of the People's Republic of China on December 13, 2003 ). The "Measures" stipulate the qualifications, application materials, approval procedures, approval authority, and disqualification of foreigners for permanent residence in China. Article 2 of the "Measures": "Permanent residence of foreigners in China means that the period of residence of foreigners in China is not limited." Article 3: "Permanent Residence Permit for Foreigners" refers to foreigners who have obtained the qualification for permanent residence in China. The legal identity document for residence in China can be used alone." Article 4: "Foreigners who have obtained permanent residence qualifications in China shall enter and exit China with valid passports and "Permanent Residence Permits for Foreigners"."  2010 On April 24, according to the "Decision of the State Council on Amending the Implementation Rules of the Law of the People's Republic of China on the Administration of the Entry and Exit of Aliens") Article 18 stipulates: "The validity period of a foreigner's residence permit can be issued for 1 to 5 years. The county public security bureau determines the reason for the foreigner's residence. For foreigners who meet the provisions of Article 14 of the "Law on the Administration of Entry and Exit of Foreigners", the public security organ may issue a certificate of long-term residence for 1 to 5 years; A document that can issue permanent residence status."

On September 30, 2014, Chinese Premier Li Keqiang stated that it will be easier for foreigners to get green cards in China in the future, which will make it more convenient for foreigners to carry out teaching and research in China and invest in business.

On January 12, 2016, the Ministry of Public Security of China released 20 entry-exit policy measures to support Beijing's innovative development on its website, including foreign Chinese with a doctoral degree or above or working in Zhongguancun enterprises for 4 consecutive years, and each year in China. Accumulated actual residence is not less than 6 months, you can directly apply for permanent residence in China.

From December 9, 2016, the “New Ten” entry-exit policy for the construction of Shanghai Science and Technology Innovation Center will be officially implemented, which will provide more convenience in attracting overseas talents to innovate and start businesses, and foreign talents can live and work in peace and contentment.

On April 17, 2017, the Ministry of Public Security issued the "Reform Plan for Facilitation of Permanent Residence Permits for Foreigners", which was reviewed and approved at the 32nd meeting of the Central Leading Group for Comprehensively Deepening Reforms. The "Plan" clarifies the reform measures for the permanent residence permit for foreigners, including the plan to change the "permanent residence permit for foreigners" to "permanent residence ID card for foreigners" to strengthen the identity authentication function; Redesign is carried out, referring to the second-generation resident ID card to optimize the document design, unify technical standards, and embed a chip in the document to store the certificate issuance management information, so as to realize the identification and verification of the second-generation resident ID card reading machine. In addition, the relevant information systems of railways, civil aviation, insurance, hotels, banks and other related information systems will be transformed to realize the sharing of information on permanent resident foreigners among departments. In addition, the public security department will also carry out targeted publicity to increase the awareness of the "permanent residence ID card for foreigners"

On June 16, 2017, the Ministry of Public Security issued the "People's Republic of China Permanent Resident Identity Cards for Foreigners" to foreigners who have been approved for permanent residence in China, and stopped the issuance of "Foreigners Permanent Resident Certificates". The new version adds the word "identity" to the name; the new version of the ID card is more recognizable. It is designed and produced with reference to the standard of the second-generation resident ID card , and has an embedded non-contact circuit chip, which can be read by the second-generation resident ID card. machine read. From June 1, holders of valid foreign permanent residence permits can apply to the original acceptance authority or the public security authority of a city divided into districts where they live to apply for a new version of the certificate. After the new version of the Chinese green card is activated, the current permanent residence permit for foreigners that is still valid can continue to be used, and the holder can also apply for a new version of the certificate  .

On February 27, 2020, the Ministry of Justice publicly solicited opinions on the Regulations on the Administration of Permanent Residence of Foreigners . After the public opinion draft of this regulation was published, it immediately aroused almost one-sided opposition from the public.

Information 

 Name of holder
 Gender/Sex: "Male/M" or "Female/F"
 Date of Birth: YYYY.MM.DD
 Nationality/Nationality: Chinese name of the holder's nationality/ nationality code
 Validity Period/Period of Validity: 20YY.MM.DD-20YY.MM.DD
 Issuing Authority: National Immigration Administration, PRC (formerly Ministry of Public Security)
 15-digit ID number/Card No.

Coding Rules 
The combination of the 15-digit ID number is as follows:

Validity period 
Regarding the issuance of the "Permanent Residence Permit for Foreigners of the People's Republic of China", Article 19 of the "Measures" stipulates: "Foreigners who are approved for permanent residence in China, the Ministry of Public Security shall issue a "Permanent Residence Permit for Foreigners"; Overseas, the Ministry of Public Security will issue the "Confirmation Form of Permanent Residence Status for Foreigners", and the applicant will go to the Chinese embassy or consulate abroad to apply for a residence visa (D visa) with the "Confirmation Form of Permanent Residence Status of Foreigners", 30 days after entry They can obtain the "Permanent Residence Permit for Foreigners" from the public security organ that accepts their application within the country."

Article 20 of the "Measures" stipulates: "Foreigners who have been approved for permanent residence in China shall stay in China for not less than three months in total each year. Approved by the public security department or bureau of the province, autonomous region or municipality directly under the Central Government where the long-term residency resides, but the cumulative stay in China within five years shall not be less than one year.”

Article 21 of the "Measures" stipulates: "The "Permanent Residence Permit for Foreigners" is valid for five or ten years. Foreigners under the age of 18 who have been approved for permanent residence in China are issued with a validity period of five years. Foreigners over the age of 18 who have been approved for permanent residence in China will be issued with a “Permanent Residence Permit for Foreigners” valid for ten years.”

According to a report in 2004, "foreigners come to China for short-term residence, long-term residence and permanent residence." In 2003, there were 230,000 foreigners living in China for a long time. The newly launched "Permanent Residence Permit for Foreigners of the People's Republic of China" is an important reform of the People's Republic of China on the entry and residence of foreigners since 1949.

See also 

 Blue Card (European Union)
 Green card

References 

International travel documents
Immigration documents
Residency
Residence permit